The Gibbet of Montfaucon was the main gallows and gibbet of the Kings of France until the time of Louis XIII of France. It was used to execute criminals, often traitors, by hanging and to display their dead bodies as a warning to the population. It was a large structure located at the top of a small hill near the modern Place du Colonel Fabien in Paris, though during the Middle Ages it was outside the city walls and the surrounding area was mostly not built up, being occupied by institutions like the Hôpital Saint-Louis from 1607, and earlier the Convent of the Filles-Dieu ("Daughters of God"), a home for 200 reformed prostitutes, and the leper colony of St Lazare.

First built during the reign of King Louis IX as a sign of royal justice in the late 13th century, the gibbet was later institutionalised under King Charles IV where the wooden scaffold was converted into stone with sixteen columns at a height of 10 meters. It was used until 1627 and then dismantled in 1760. A smaller gibbet was erected nearby for ceremonial purposes rather than for execution.

As reconstructed in images by Eugène Viollet-le-Duc it had three sides, and 45 compartments in which people could be both hanged and hung after execution elsewhere. A miniature of about 1460 from the Grandes Chroniques de France by Jean Fouquet, and also a print of 1609, show a somewhat less substantial structure than that in the reconstructions, which may, like others by Viollet-le-Duc, make the structure grander and more complex than was actually the case. The miniature shows bodies hanging from beams running across the central space, resting on the piers, but Viollet-le-Duc shows slabs running round the sides.  Both show a substantial platform in masonry, which ran round a central space at ground level in the reconstructions, entered by a tunnel through the platform, closed by a gate. Another print of 1608 shows only two tiers of compartments rather than the three of Viollet-le-Duc. The English travel writer Thomas Coryat saw it at about the same time and described it as "the fayrest gallowes that I ever saw, built on a little hillocke ... [with] fourteen pillars of free stone".

Like an alarming number of other victims, Essarts had been one of the four royal treasurers. 

The gibbet was a great favourite of popular historians and historical writers of the 19th century, appearing in historical novels including The Hunchback of Notre-Dame (1831) by Victor Hugo, Crichton (1837) by William Harrison Ainsworth, and La Reine Margot (1845) by Alexandre Dumas; both the last two tales centred on the St. Bartholomew's Day Massacre. The former site of the gibbet is featured in the 1996 video game Broken Sword: The Shadow of the Templars.

Executions

Those executed or displayed there include:
 1278: Pierre de La Brosse, favourite and grand chamberlain of King Philip III of France.
 1315: Enguerrand de Marigny, former treasurer for King Philip IV of France.
 1322: , treasurer for King Philip V of France.
 1322: , Gascon brigand, nephew by marriage of Pope John XXII.
 1328: , seigneur de Montigny, treasurer for King Charles IV of France.
 1378: , chamberlain of Charles II of Navarre.
 1378: , secretary of Charles II of Navarre.
 1386: , knight who was killed during a trial by combat versus Jean de Carrouges. His body was dragged to Montfaucon and displayed there after his death.
 1409: Jean de Montagu, treasurer of King Charles VI of France.
 1413: , also treasurer for Charles VI.
 1460: , brigand from the "coquillards".
 1484: Olivier Le Daim, confidant of King Louis XI of France.
 1525: Barbiton, Jean Charrot and Jean Lubbe, brigands.
 1527: , baron de Semblançay, vicomte de Tours, Surintendant des Finances for King Francis I of France.
 1572: The body of Admiral Gaspard II de Coligny, slain in the St. Bartholomew's Day massacre, was displayed there, hung by the feet.

References

Execution sites in France
Buildings and structures completed in the 13th century
Buildings and structures demolished in 1760
History of Paris